The County of Flinders is a county (a cadastral division) in Queensland, Australia, located in the Central Queensland region between Gladstone and Bundaberg.  The county is divided into civil  parishes. It was named for Matthew Flinders who explored the Australian coastline.

The county was created on 1 September 1855 by royal proclamation under the Waste Lands Australia Act 1846. On 7 March 1901, the Governor issued a proclamation legally dividing Queensland into counties under the Land Act 1897. Its schedule described Flinders thus:

Parishes
Flinders is divided into parishes, as listed below:

References

External links 

 

Flinders